An octave band is a frequency band that spans one octave. In this context an octave can be a factor of 2 or a factor of 100.3. 2/1 = 1200 cents ≈ 10.

Analyzing a source on a frequency by frequency basis is possible but time-consuming. The whole frequency range is divided into sets of frequencies called bands. Each band covers a specific range of frequencies. For this reason, a scale of octave bands and one-third octave bands has been developed. A band is said to be an octave in width when the upper band frequency is twice the lower band frequency. A one-third octave band is defined as a frequency band whose upper band-edge frequency (f2) is the lower band frequency (f1) times the cube root of two.

Octave bands

Calculation
If  is the center frequency of an octave band, one can compute the octave band boundaries as

,

where  is the lower frequency boundary and  the upper one.

Naming

One-third octave bands

Base 2 calculation

%% Calculate Third Octave Bands (base 2) in Matlab
fcentre  = 10^3 * (2 .^ ([-18:13]/3))
fd = 2^(1/6);
fupper = fcentre * fd
flower = fcentre / fd

Base 10 calculation

%% Calculate Third Octave Bands (base 10) in Matlab
fcentre = 10.^(0.1.*[12:43])
fd = 10^0.05;
fupper = fcentre * fd
flower = fcentre / fd

Naming

See also 
Octave
Octave (electronics)

References

Acoustics